"Misty" is a jazz standard written in 1954 by pianist Erroll Garner. He composed it as an instrumental in the traditional 32-bar format, and recorded it for the album Contrasts. Lyrics were added later by Johnny Burke. It appeared on Johnny Mathis' 1959 album Heavenly, and this recording reached number 12 on the U.S. Pop Singles chart later that year. It has since become the signature song of Mathis.

The song has been recorded by many other artists, including versions by Ella Fitzgerald, Sarah Vaughan, and Ray Stevens who released a hit country version in 1975. Recordings by both Mathis and Garner have been inducted into the Grammy Hall of Fame. It was ranked number 174 in the list of the Songs of the Century compiled by Recording Industry Association of America and National Endowment for the Arts.

Composition
Erroll Garner was inspired to write "Misty" on a flight from San Francisco to Chicago which passed through a thunderstorm: as the plane descended into O'Hare, Garner looked through the window to see a rainbow glowing through a haze, and was moved to begin composing "Misty" on the spot, striking imaginary piano keys on his knees as he hummed the notes he imagined (causing his neighboring passenger to summon a flight attendant to assist the apparently ill Garner).

The lyrics were added later by Johnny Burke.  Burke was initially reluctant to write for the song, but was persuaded to do so at the insistence of his pianist Herb Mesick, who knew Garner and was fond of the tune. It was said that Mesick would play the tune every time Burke came into the room, until Burke said: "Alright, give me the damn music, and I'll do it." Burke wrote the lyrics in two to three hours in the bedroom.

Early recordings
Garner first recorded his rendition of "Misty" on piano in 1954, accompanied by Wyatt Ruther on bass and Fats Heard on drums. The recording was first released in October 1954 credited to Errol Garner Trio, and it was included in Garner's album Contrasts released in December 1954. Garner later re-recorded the song with an orchestral arrangement by Mitch Miller for his album Other Voices in 1957. Instrumental versions were also recorded by Georgie Auld and Johnny Costa in 1955. Garner's original recording was ranked No. 174 in the list of the Songs of the Century compiled by RIAA and NEA. 

After lyrics were written for "Misty", Dakota Staton was the first to record the song in 1957. A number of artists also recorded the song, but it was the recording by Sarah Vaughan that drew greater attention to the song. Vaughan recorded the song in a 1958 Paris session, with an arrangement by Quincy Jones for her album Vaughan and Violins. It was released backed with "Broken Hearted Melody", and it reached No. 6 on the Bubbling Under chart in July 1959. Those who recorded the song after Vaughn included Count Basie, Ella Fitzgerald, and most notably Johnny Mathis who created the best-known version of the song.

Johnny Mathis version

Background
Mathis first heard Garner play the tune when he was a teenager, and told him that he would love to sing it if Garner had lyrics for it. A few years later, having heard Vaughan's version of the song, he chose "Misty" as one of the possible songs for his 1959 album Heavenly, and informed Garner that he would record the song. However, at the recording session for the album, it was scheduled that Mathis should record a show tune rather than "Misty". Accounts differ as to whether it was Garner or Garner's business manager, Martha Glaser, who turned up unexpectedly at the recording session, and Mathis then insisted on recording "Misty" to fulfil his promise to record the song with the unexpected guest in attendance.

Glenn Osser arranged the song at short notice, with Andy Ackers playing the piano.  Mathis revealed that, on the high-pitched note when he first started singing "On my own" after the instrumental break, he used a technique of standing a distance from the microphone and then walked slowly toward it to create a fade in effect. Mathis said that "Misty" was the song he was most proud of, because he recorded the song the way he wanted to, rather than relying on the producer Mitch Miller.

The song was initially released as a back-to-back single together with Garner's version intended only for those in the broadcasting industry, but due to heavy demand Columbia released Mathis' recording as a commercial single in September 1959. It reached No. 12 on Billboard Hot 100. Although the song is not Mathis' highest charting song, it became his signature song. Mathis received his first Grammy nomination for the song at the 3rd Annual Grammy Awards in the Best Male Pop Vocal Performance category. Both Mathis' and Garner's recordings were inducted into the Grammy Hall of Fame, Garner in 1991 and Mathis in 2002.

Chart performance

Weekly singles

Play Misty for Me
Clint Eastwood used the instrumental version in his 1971 film Play Misty for Me, a low-budget film that proved to be a box-office success. Eastwood was said to have paid Garner a $25,000 fee for the right to use the tune in his film.

Ray Stevens version

Background and release
In 1975, singer Ray Stevens released an up-tempo country rendition of this song. It is the title track of his twelfth studio album. Stevens recounted that the song was recorded on the second take when experimenting in the studio. His version won a Grammy in the category of Music Arrangement of the Year. This version peaked at No. 14 on the Billboard Hot 100 and reached No. 2 in the United Kingdom.

Chart performance

Weekly singles

Year-end charts

Other notable versions
 Count Basie, Dance Along with Basie (1959)
 Bing Crosby recorded the song in 1961 for use on his radio show, and it was included on the album With All My Heart (2012)
 Aretha Franklin, Yeah!!! (1965)
Groove Holmes hit the Hot 100 with his version (1966)
Tsuyoshi Yamamoto Trio – 1974 – "Misty" – Three Blind Mice

References

External links
 "Misty" at jazzstandards.com  
 Misty chord/melody and solo studies for guitar 
 
 
 

1954 songs
1959 singles
1963 singles
1975 singles
1950s jazz standards
Songs with lyrics by Johnny Burke (lyricist)
Ella Fitzgerald songs
Frank Sinatra songs
Lloyd Price songs
Ray Stevens songs
Johnny Mathis songs
Lesley Gore songs
Little Willie Littlefield songs
Sarah Vaughan songs
Andy Williams songs
Grammy Hall of Fame Award recipients
Jazz compositions in E-flat major
Columbia Records singles